Patrick Sabongui (born January 9, 1975) is a Canadian actor, stunt performer, theatre actor, and drama teacher. He is also known for his role as David Singh in the CW series The Flash.

Personal life
Born to an Egyptian family, Sabongui obtained a BFA in drama for human development at Concordia University. In 2005 he earned a Master of Fine Arts in acting from the University of California, Irvine.

Sabongui lives in Los Angeles and Vancouver with his wife, Kyra Zagorsky, whom he married on August 5, 2002, and their two children.

Filmography

References

External links
 

1975 births
Canadian male film actors
Canadian male television actors
Canadian male voice actors
Canadian stunt performers
Concordia University alumni
Living people
Male actors from Montreal
University of California, Irvine alumni
Canadian people of Egyptian descent